The 1860 Democratic National Conventions were a series of presidential nominating conventions held to nominate the Democratic Party's candidates for president and vice president in the 1860 election. The first convention, held from April 23 to May 3 in Charleston, South Carolina, failed to nominate a ticket, while two subsequent conventions, both held in Baltimore, Maryland in June, nominated two separate presidential tickets.

Senator Stephen A. Douglas of Illinois entered the Charleston convention as the front-runner for the presidential nomination, and while he won a majority on the first presidential ballot of the convention, the convention rules required a two-thirds majority to win the nomination, with Douglas's adherence to the Freeport Doctrine regarding slavery in the territories engendering strong opposition from many Southern delegates: opponents of Douglas's nomination spread their support among five major candidates, including former Treasury Secretary James Guthrie of Kentucky and Senator Robert M. T. Hunter of Virginia. After 57 ballots over a span of two days, in which Douglas consistently won at least half of the delegates, the Charleston convention adjourned when it became apparent no candidate could secure the required two-thirds of all votes.

The Democratic convention reconvened in Baltimore on June 18, but many Southern delegates either boycotted the convention or walked out in protest after the convention adopted a platform in which it pledged to abide by the decision of the Supreme Court of the United States upon questions of Constitutional Law regarding slavery. While Douglas was nominated for president on the second ballot (the 59th ballot overall), Senator Benjamin Fitzpatrick of Alabama was nominated for vice president, but he refused the nomination: he was replaced by former Governor Herschel Vespasian Johnson of Georgia.

The boycotting Southern Democrats and those who had walked out held their own separate convention and adopted a pro-slavery platform, nominating Vice President John C. Breckinridge for president, and Senator Joseph Lane of Oregon for vice president. While Douglas and Breckinridge received a combined 47.62% of the popular vote in the 1860 presidential election, they lost the election to Republican candidate Abraham Lincoln.

Charleston convention

Background 

The front-runner for the nomination was Douglas, who was considered a moderate on the slavery issue. With the 1854 Kansas–Nebraska Act, he advanced the doctrine of popular sovereignty: allowing settlers in each Territory to decide for themselves whether slavery would be allowed—a change from the flat prohibition of slavery in most Territories under the Missouri Compromise, which the South had welcomed. However, the Supreme Court’s ensuing 1857 'Dred Scott' decision declared that the Constitution protected slavery in all Territories.

Douglas was challenged for his Senate seat by Abraham Lincoln in 1858, and narrowly won re-election, after the Lincoln-Douglas debates, by professing the Freeport Doctrine, a de facto rejection of Dred Scott, with militant Southern "Fire-Eaters", such as William Yancey of Alabama, opposing him as a traitor. Many of them openly predicted a split in the party and the election of Republican front-runner William H. Seward.

The 1860 Democratic National Convention convened at South Carolina Institute Hall (destroyed in the Great Fire of 1861) in Charleston, South Carolina, on April 23, 1860. Since Charleston was the most pro-slavery city in the U.S. at the time, the galleries at the convention were packed with pro-slavery spectators.

Party Platform Disagreement 
Urged by Yancey, the delegations from seven Deep South states (Alabama, Arkansas, Florida, Georgia, Louisiana, Mississippi, and Texas) met in a separate caucus before the convention. They reached a tentative consensus to "stop Douglas" by imposing a pro-slavery party platform which he could not run on if nominated.

The "Fire-eater" majority on the convention's platform committee, chaired by William Waightstill Avery of North Carolina, produced an explicitly pro-slavery document, endorsing Dred Scott and Congressional legislation protecting slavery in the territories. Northern Democrats refused to acquiesce, as Dred Scott was extremely unpopular in the North, and the Northerners said they could not carry a single state with that platform. That would end Democratic hopes of retaining the White House, as no previous candidate had won the presidency without winning either New York or Pennsylvania, and only four (John Adams in 1796, James Madison in 1812, John Quincy Adams in 1824, and James Buchanan in 1856) had been elected without winning both. Douglas and supporters thus preferred the 1856 Cincinnati platform, pure and simple, without explanation or addition.

On April 30th, the minority (Northern) report was substituted for that of the majority (Southern) report by a vote of 165 to 138. The question next in order before the Convention was upon the adoption of the second resolution of the minority of the committee. On this question Alabama, Arkansas, one of Delaware's delegates, Florida, Georgia, Louisiana, Mississippi, and Texas refused to vote. The Douglas party abandoned the vague second resolution and it was defeated by an overwhelming vote of 238 to 21 (with 44 abstentions).

Between April 30th and May 1st, 51 Southern delegates walked out of the convention in protest: the entire Alabama, Florida, Georgia, Louisiana, Mississippi, South Carolina, and Texas delegations, three of the four delegates from Arkansas and one of the three delegates from Delaware. These delegates gathered at St. Andrews Hall on Broad Street and declared themselves the real convention as the Institute Hall convention proceeded to nominations.

Since both the majority and the minority resolutions on the Territorial question were rejected, nothing remained except the Cincinnati platform as the Douglas faction had desired. The dominant Douglas forces believed their path was now clear.

Two-Thirds Rule 
Before the balloting for president commenced, Mr. Howard of Tennessee succeeded in obtaining a vote of the convention in affirmance of the two-thirds rule. On his motion they resolved, by 141 to 112 votes, "that the President of the Convention be and he is hereby directed not to declare any person nominated for the office of President or Vice President unless he shall have received a number of votes equal to two-thirds of the votes of all the Electoral Colleges." It was well known at the time that this resolution rendered the regular nomination of Douglas impossible.

Presidential balloting 
Six major candidates were nominated at the convention: Douglas, former Treasury Secretary James Guthrie of Kentucky, Senator Robert M. T. Hunter of Virginia, Senator Joseph Lane of Oregon, former Senator Daniel S. Dickinson of New York, and Senator Andrew Johnson of Tennessee.

Presidential candidates 

While Douglas led on the first ballot, receiving 145½ of 253 votes cast, convention rules at the time required a two-thirds vote to win the nomination. Further to this, convention chairman Caleb Cushing further ruled that this was two-thirds of the whole membership, not just two-thirds of those present and voting.

This ruling meant Douglas needed 202 votes (or 56½ more votes), or 80% of the remaining 253 delegates, and also would have required several of the remaining Southern delegates to vote for Douglas, who they vehemently opposed.

Consequently, the convention held 57 ballots, and though Douglas led on all of them, he never received more than 152½ votes. On the 57th ballot, Douglas received 151½ votes, still 50½ votes short of the nomination, though far ahead of Guthrie, who was second with 65½. On 3 May, the delegates voted to adjourn the convention, and reconvene in Baltimore six weeks later.

A few votes went to former Senator Isaac Toucey of Connecticut and Senator James Pearce of Maryland, while Senator Jefferson Davis of Mississippi (the future Confederate President) received one vote on over fifty ballots from Benjamin Butler of Massachusetts. Ironically, during the Civil War, Butler became a Union general, and Davis ordered him hanged as a criminal if ever captured.

1st Day of Presidential Balloting / 8th Day of Convention (May 1, 1860)

2nd Day of Presidential Balloting / 9th Day of Convention (May 2, 1860)

Baltimore convention (Northern Democratic) 
The Democrats re-convened at the Front Street Theater (destroyed in the Great Baltimore Fire of 1904) in Baltimore, Maryland on 18 June.

Delegate Readmission Disagreement 
The resumed convention's first business was to decide whether to re-admit the delegates who had walked out of the Charleston session, or to seat replacement delegates who had been named by pro-Douglas Democrats in some states: other delegates had boycotted the Baltimore convention.

The credentials committee's majority report recommended re-admitting all delegates except those from Louisiana and Alabama, while the minority report recommended re-admitting some of the Louisiana and Alabama delegates as well. On June 22nd, the minority (Southern) report failed to be substituted for that of the majority (Northern) report by a vote of 100½-150.

After the rejection of the minority report, two votes were taken on the reconsideration of the substitution vote. At first, New York revived hopes of adopting the minority report by voting for its reconsideration. But during the second vote on reconsideration, New York switched back to its original vote.

With the admission of the new Louisiana and Alabama delegates, 56 delegates - most of those remaining from the South, and a scattering of delegates from northern and far western states - all walked out of the convention in protest.

Presidential balloting 
After the convention resumed voting on a nominee, Douglas received 173½ of 190½ votes cast on the first ballot (the 58th overall), and 181½ votes of 194½ votes cast on the second ballot (the 59th overall).

After a rollcall following the second ballot, it was realized that there were only 194½ delegates present, meaning there were insufficient delegates for Douglas to receive 202 votes as per Cushing's earlier ruling.

After the delegates unanimously voted to rescind this, it was declared by acclamation that Douglas had received the required two-thirds of the votes cast, and was therefore nominated.

Presidential candidates

Declined

Vice Presidential balloting 
Senator Benjamin Fitzpatrick of Alabama was the only candidate for the vice presidential nomination.

During the call of the states, every vote recorded was in favor of Fitzpatrick with no exception until Pennsylvania was reached. One of Pennsylvania's votes was announced for William C. Alexander of New Jersey. Upon this announcement, a New Jersey delegate informed the delegates that he had been authorized before the convention, by Alexander himself, not to allow his name to be presented as a candidate. The Pennsylvanian who desired Alexander cast one blank vote thereafter.

Vice Presidential candidate

Vice Presidential replacement 
After the unanimous nomination of Fitzpatrick as the candidate for Vice President, the convention adjourned on June 23rd, the sixth and last day of its session. On the same day, but after the adjournment, Fitzpatrick declined the nomination. Fitzpatrick's refusal of the vice presidential nomination occurred sixteen years after Silas Wright was the first to turndown the honor. In 1924, Frank Lowden would be the third and last person to date who refused their party's vice presidential nomination.

Vice Presidential candidate 

Since the convention had already adjourned, the Executive Committee would have to name a replacement. On motion of Mr. Dick, the lone delegate from North Carolina, the vice presidential nomination  was immediately conferred on former Senator and Governor Herschel V. Johnson of Georgia by unanimous acclamation.

Baltimore convention (Southern Democratic) 
A second convention assembled at Baltimore on June 23, 1860. It was composed chiefly of the delegates who had just withdrawn from the Northern Democratic convention. One of their first acts was to abrogate the two-thirds rule, as had been done by the Douglas convention. Both conventions acted under the same necessity, because the preservation of this rule would have prevented a nomination by either.

The majority resolutions, whose replacement by the minority report facilitated the breakup of the Charleston convention, were reported and "adopted unanimously, amid great applause."

Presidential balloting 
After the adoption of the majority resolutions, the convention proceeded to select their candidates. Four names were placed in nomination: Breckinridge, Dickinson, Hunter, and Lane.

Presidential candidates 

Despite instructions from their state convention, the Mississippi delegation, with Jefferson Davis' concurrence, desired that his name be removed from possible consideration for the sake of harmony. The names of Hunter and Lane were subsequently withdrawn in the spirit of harmony and unanimity. After New York had cast an obligatory vote for Dickinson, Breckinridge was declared the unanimous choice of the convention for President.

Vice Presidential balloting 
After the applause for Breckinridge's nomination had subsided, the whole hall resounded with cries for Yancey for Vice President. After Yancey got on his feet, but before he could speak, Lane's name was presented and seconded. No other name being presented for the office, the states were called and voted unanimously for Lane.

Vice Presidential candidates

Consequences 
After the break-up of the Charleston convention, many of those present stated that the Republicans were now certain to win the 1860 Presidential election.

In the general election, the actual division in Democratic popular votes did not directly affect any state outcomes except California, Oregon, Kentucky, Tennessee, and Virginia. Of these states, only California and Oregon were free states, and although both were carried by Republican nominee Abraham Lincoln they combined for only seven of Lincoln's 180 electoral votes. The latter three states were slave states that were carried by neither Douglas, Breckinridge nor Lincoln but by John Bell, nominee of the Constitutional Union Party. Composed mainly of former Whigs and Know-Nothings, the Constitutional Union Party attempted to ignore the slavery issue in favor of preserving the Union.

Even if California, Oregon and every state carried by Douglas, Breckinridge or Bell had been carried by a single presidential nominee, Lincoln would still have had a large majority of electoral votes. However, the split in the Democratic Party organization was a serious handicap in many states, especially Pennsylvania, and almost certainly reduced the aggregate Democratic popular vote. Pennsylvania's 27 electoral votes were especially decisive in ensuring a Republican victory – had Lincoln failed to carry that state combined with any other free state, he could not have obtained a majority of electoral votes, forcing a contingent election in the House of Representatives.

James M. McPherson suggested in Battle Cry of Freedom that the “Fire-eater” program of breaking up the convention and running a rival ticket was deliberately intended to bring about the election of a Republican as president, and thus trigger secession declarations by the slave-owning states. Whatever the “intent” of the fire-eaters may have been, doubtless many of them favored secession, and the logical, probable, and actual consequence of their actions was to fragment the Democratic party and thereby virtually ensure a Republican victory.

See also 
 History of the United States Democratic Party
 U.S. presidential nomination convention
 List of Democratic National Conventions
 1860 Republican National Convention
 1860 United States presidential election

References 

 Official proceedings of the Democratic national convention, held in 1860, at Charleston and Baltimore
 Proceedings of the conventions at Charleston and Baltimore. Published by order of the National Democratic Convention assembled in Maryland Institute, Baltimore, and under the supervision of the National Democratic Executive Committee. (Breckinridge Faction)

External links 
 Democratic Party Platform of 1860 at The American Presidency Project
 Democratic Party Platform (Breckinridge Faction) of 1860

1860 United States presidential election
1860 in South Carolina
History of Charleston, South Carolina
Events in Charleston, South Carolina
Political conventions in South Carolina
South Carolina Democratic Party
19th century in Baltimore
1860 in Maryland
Political conventions in Baltimore
Maryland Democratic Party
Political events in Maryland
Democratic National Conventions
Secession crisis of 1860–61
1860 conferences
April 1860 events
May 1860 events
June 1860 events
19th-century in Charleston, South Carolina